Kellie Anne Sloane (5 January 1973) is an Australian political candidate, former charity CEO and television journalist.

Sloane was a presenter on the Nine Network's Nightline, and was also briefly an interim co-host of Today in 2007.

Career
Sloane first began her media career at ABC Local Radio in Adelaide in 1991, where she was a cadet reporter and a newsreader. She later moved to ABC TV in Adelaide.

She later joined Ten News as a reporter and fill-in presenter for the weekend news, before moving to Northbridge, New South Wales.

Sloane joined the Nine Network in 1997 as a lifestyle series reporter for both A Current Affair and Money. She moved from A Current Affair in 2005, during a revamp of the programme to combat a ratings slump against rival Seven Network's Today Tonight.

Sloane was then promoted to full-time news presenter at the Nine Network, filling in on the National Nine Early News alongside Sarah Murdoch, and Nightline. In 2006 she was appointed permanent presenter of National Nine News Afternoon Edition, replacing Mike Munro.

In April 2007, Sloane moved to co-hosting Today working with Karl Stefanovic as the stand-in replacement co-host for Jessica Rowe, who was on maternity leave at the time, however Rowe announced that she was leaving the Nine Network on 6 May 2007.

On 10 May 2007, in one of the most memorable incidents on Today, Sloane collapsed live on air. The collapse occurred at 8:10am during a cooking segment with celebrity chef Tobie Puttock, of Jamie Oliver fame. It was reported that she was okay after the incident and Sloane returned to the presenters desk about 15 minutes later, allegedly attributing the "dizzy spell" to her 3am wake-up call. Vision of Sloane collapsing in slow motion later went viral on social media with YouTube. The incident was parodied on an episode of ABC TV's The Chaser's War on Everything.

Sloane finished co-hosting for Today on 25 May 2007, as Lisa Wilkinson took over hosting duties as of 28 May 2007.

On 18 June 2007, Sloane returned as presenter of the National Nine News Afternoon Edition. In late 2007, she also presented the National Nine News Morning Edition.

In September 2008, she returned to presenting the Nine's Morning News.

In October 2009, the Nine Network announced that Sloane would be shifted to the late night news programme Nightline, with Wendy Kingston moving to present Nine's Morning News Hour. She was also a fill in presenter for Nine News in Sydney.

In July 2010, with declining ratings, Nine announced Nightline would be axed immediately with reporters who were on duty retained, presenting late news updates in its place. Nine offered Sloane a redundancy package after 13 years at the Nine Network.

From June 2012 to June 2015, Sloane filled in for Samantha Armytage on the Seven Network's Weekend Sunrise, and was also a regular on Kochie's Angels on Sunrise. Sloane has since left television.

In August 2015, Sloane was appointed CEO of Life Education NSW. Based in Sydney's western suburbs, Life Education reaches 300,000 NSW school children every year with preventative health programs, and is known for its iconic mascot Healthy Harold. 

Sloane was a finalist in the 2017 Telstra Business Woman of the Year Awards, For Purpose and Social enterprise category. She has also served as a Non Executive Director on the boards of Life Education NSW (2015-16) and Miracle Babies Foundation (2009-2013).

In November 2022, she was selected as the Liberal Party candidate for the electorate of Vaucluse at the 2023 New South Wales state election.

Personal life
Sloane was born and raised in the Barossa Valley, South Australia. She is married to Adam Connolly and they have three children. They reside in Centennial Park, New South Wales. Sloane used her married name Connolly professionally from 2003, before reverting to her maiden name in 2013.

References

1973 births
Living people